Phraya Thephatsadin, personal name Phat Thephatsadin na Ayutthaya (the surname is also spelled as Devahastin na Ayudhya) was a Thai military ambassador that participated in World War I and served as the Minister of Transport of Thailand of the government of Plaek Phibunsongkhram.

Early life
Phat was born on 6 February 1878, near  in what was then  (now Bangkok) as the eldest son of a total of 8 siblings, his father being Colonel Luang Rit Naiwen (Phut Thephatsadin na Ayutthaya), who was a half-brother of Chaophraya Thammasakmontri. 

When Phat was 5 years old, he was brought to King Chulalongkorn to offer flowers, incense sticks and candles as royal gifts, as was traditional for noble families to place their sons in the service of the royal court. The King stated the following about him:

After the death of his father, who was then deputy commander of the Army War Department, Chulalongkorn sent Phat to for studies in France and he later transferred to a Royal Military Academy in Brussels, Belgium, returning in 1902.

World War I

On 22 July 1917, Thailand declared war on Germany and Austria-Hungary in World War I with a royal decree calling for volunteers to enlist in the Siamese Expeditionary Forces; many volunteers applied. During this time, Phat, who at this time had the title of Major General Phraya Phichaichanrit, was promoted by King Vajiravudh to be the head of a special diplomatic mission in the position of commander-in-chief of the Expeditionary Forces, leading the forces that would participate in the Western Front.

After returning from the war, he resigned from his military position and was transferred to the civil service, with the noble title Phraya Thephatsadin, serving as the samuhathesaphiban or royal commissioner in the monthon of Nakhon Sawan and Ratchaburi. He also founded the Siam Taxi Company in Thailand in 1923.

Throughout his government service, Thephatsadin was reputed to be very loyal to the monarchy and even had a personal friendship with the King, with a tale recounting that Vajiravudh once shared a coconut he was drinking from with him.

Songsuradet rebellion

When Plaek Phibunsongkhram (Phibun) became prime minister of Thailand, in December 1938 there was a political purge of those accused of conspiring to seize power from the government and attempt to assassinate Phibun. Over 51 suspects were arrested in the early morning of 29 January 1939, and a special court was established to try them, which sentenced 21 prisoners to death, including Thephatsadin and two of his sons. However, his sentence was reduced to life imprisonment due to his previous deeds. 

When the Phibun government was ousted, Khuang Aphaiwong succeeded as Prime Minister on 1 August 1944. The first thing the new government did was ask for royal pardons for all political prisoners, and Thephatsdin was set free on 20 September 1944 and amnesty was granted three years later in September 1947.

Many years later, Thephatsdin received an apology letter from Phibun for having misunderstood the whole matter and asked for forgiveness.

Political career
Phraya Thephatsadin was a Member of the House of Representatives, representing the Phra Nakhon Province from the 1933 Siamese general election, which was considered the first election of Thailand and held the position of Deputy Speaker of the House of Representatives.

In his later years, he had received the highest rank of General and became the Minister of Transport in the government of Plaek Phibunsongkhram on November 30, 1948, who returned to receive the position of Prime Minister again after the 1947 Thai coup d'état and the 1948 Thai coup d'état, with Thephatsadin's own personal involvement to support Phibun's position as prime minister.

Awards
Ratana Varabhorn Order of Merit
Order of the Crown of Thailand, Special Class
Order of the White Elephant, 1st Class
Order of Chula Chom Klao, 2nd Class
Dushdi Mala Medal
Chakra Mala Medal
Saratul Mala Medal
King Vajiravudh's old courtiers' pin

See also
Devahastin family

References

Further reading
 
 

1878 births
1951 deaths
Ministers of Transport of Thailand
Members of the 1st House of Representatives of Thailand
Phraya
Royal Thai Army generals
19th-century Thai people
Devahastin family